Henri Laaksonen was the defending champion and successfully defended his title.

Laaksonen won the title after defeating Ruben Bemelmans 7–5, 6–3 in the final.

Seeds

Draw

Finals

Top half

Bottom half

References
Main Draw
Qualifying Draw

JSM Challenger of Champaign-Urbana - Singles